Television in Montenegro was first introduced in 1956.
This is a list of television channels that broadcast in Montenegro.

National

RTCG
 TVCG 1, since 1963
 TVCG 2, since 1971
 TVCG Sat – satellite

Private
 Vijesti, since 2008
 Prva TV, since 2011
 Nova M, since 2018
 Adria TV, since 2006

Local
 Gradska RTV - From Podgorica, seen in Podgorica and neighboring area
 TV 777 - From Podgorica, seen in Podgorica and neighboring area
 RTV APR – From Rožaje, seen in Rožaje and Berane
 RTV Nikšić – From Nikšić, seen in and around Nikšić
 TV Budva – From Budva, seen in and around Budva
 RTPV – From Pljevlja, seen in and around Pljevlja
 TV Teuta – From Ulcinj, seen in Ulcinj, Bar, Podgorica
 TV Novi - From Herceg Novi, seen in Herceg Novi and neighboring area
 TV BOiN – From Tuzi, seen in Tuzi, Ulcinj, Podgorica
 TV SUN – From Bijelo Polje, seen in and around Bijelo Polje

Defunct TV stations
 Elmag (Podgorica) (until 2010)
 Montena (Podgorica) (from 2001 to 2015)
 IN TV (Podgorica) (from 2002 to 2013)
 MBC (Podgorica) (until 2014)
 Pink M (Budva and Podgorica) (from 2002 to 2018)
 Atlas (Podgorica) (from 2006 to 2017)
 RTV A1 (Podgorica) (from 2018 until 2021)

See also
 List of television stations in Serbia and Montenegro

References